James Arthur Adams (2 August 1937 – 30 December 2005) was an English footballer who played at full-back for Port Vale, Crewe Alexandra and Macclesfield Town from 1956 to 1963.

Career
Adams spent his youth with Wolverhampton Wanderers, before he returned to his hometown of Stoke-on-Trent to sign for Freddie Steele's Port Vale in May 1956. There he was converted from a wing-half position to play at full-back. His only appearance for the club came in a Third Division South clash at Brentford's Griffin Park on 26 April 1958, Vale losing 4–1. He was released from Vale Park by manager Norman Low in May 1960 and later joined Crewe Alexandra. He did not feature in a senior game for the "Railwaymen", and in February 1961 joined Macclesfield Town in the Cheshire County League. He actually made his first-team debut for the "Silkmen" against Crewe Alexandra Reserves in a Cheshire Senior Cup match on 4 February. He made 46 league and 12 cup appearances, before a re-occurrence of an old knee injury forced his retirement in October 1963. During his time at Macclesfield he was employed as a draughtsman at ROF Radway Green at Radway Green.

Career statistics
Source:

References

Footballers from Stoke-on-Trent
English footballers
Association football fullbacks
Wolverhampton Wanderers F.C. players
Port Vale F.C. players
Crewe Alexandra F.C. players
Macclesfield Town F.C. players
English Football League players
1937 births
2005 deaths